"I Get Around" is a song by American rock band the Beach Boys and the opening track from their 1964 album All Summer Long. Written by Brian Wilson and Mike Love, the autobiographical lyrics describe the group's reaction to their newfound fame and success, as well as their restlessness concerning the status quo, and their desire to find new places "where the kids are hip". It was released as a single on May 11, 1964, with the B-side "Don't Worry Baby".

The single became the Beach Boys' first chart-topping hit in the U.S., as well as one of America's biggest hits since the British Invasion and the beginning of an unofficial rivalry between Wilson and the Beatles. The single also topped the Canadian charts and reached the top ten in the UK, New Zealand, and Sweden. In 2017, "I Get Around" was inducted into the Grammy Hall of Fame.

Background
"I Get Around" was written by Brian Wilson and Mike Love. Wilson was originally listed as the sole author of the song. After Love sued Wilson for songwriting credits in the 1990s, he was awarded official co-writing credits on 35 Beach Boys songs, including "I Get Around". Asked about the authorship of "I Get Around" during the court proceedings, Wilson responded, "I [wrote it], with the exception of a possible – possibility that Mike wrote the intro, the 'round 'round.'"

Lyrics
Biographer Jon Stebbins states that the song was one of several that Wilson had based on the life experiences of his brother Dennis. Brian's original lyrics in the first verse had the line "Well there's a million little girls just waitin' around / But there's only so much to do in a little town / I get around from town to town". Love told Wilson that these were "pussy lyrics" and subsequently revised them. He later wrote, 

In the first verse, the narrator expresses his boredom with "driving up and down the same old strip" and a need to "find a new place where the kids are hip". He takes notice of his and his "buddies" newfound fame, and the fact that even "bad guys" are familiar with them, although "they leave us alone". The phrase "I get around", declared in the choruses, is an expression that means the equivalent of "I know what's what". In the second and final verse, he boasts that he has the fastest car, and that he and his "buddies" are always successful at attaining women. Biographer Mark Dillon compared the lyrics to "the braggadocio of a modern-day rapper". Producer Daniel Lanois said of the song,

Composition

"I Get Around" begins in the key of G major with an a cappella intro section that contains a slower version of the chord progression used in the chorus: I–VI–ii–VII–V. Love stated that he had based the intro on the Regents' 1961 hit "Barbara-Ann", a song that the Beach Boys later covered on their 1965 album Beach Boys' Party!.

The verses alternate between ii and V, one of Wilson's favorite progressions, which he had previously used in "Little Deuce Coupe" and "Little Saint Nick". Noting the common theme between those songs and "I Get Around", musicologist Philip Lambert remarks, "Brian [had] quite literally updated the car song." Wilson cited the Chiffons' "One Fine Day" (1963) as another possible musical influence on "I Get Around".

During the instrumental solo, the key modulates to A major, which is then followed by a descent to A major.  Biographer Peter Ames Carlin distinguished the song for its "jarring rhythmic shifts, fuzz guitar, off-kilter organ riffs, and Brian's own wailing falsetto", while David Leaf called it "a major, revolutionary step in Brian's use of dynamics".

Recording
Wilson produced the backing track with his bandmates and a selection of session musicians on April 2, 1964, at Western Studios in Hollywood. This date, which coincided with the tracking for "Little Honda", marked the beginning of the All Summer Long sessions. The group overdubbed their vocals on "I Get Around" eight days later, on April 10.

Murry Wilson, the band's publisher and the Wilson brothers' father, caused disruptions during the recording of the instrumental track. Biographer Steven Gaines writes, "Murry would not stop criticizing the song and Brian's production techniques ... rambl[ing] on about what a loser Brian was, how poor the music was, and how only Murry had the real talent in the family. At one point he insisted that Brian end the session because something was wrong with the bassline." Murry also scolded Dennis, who then punched a wall and left the session. Love remembered, "Brian had a hard time standing up to his father, but this time ... he shoved his dad, who went sprawling backward. That was the only time I ever saw Brian defy him physically, and Murry, defeated, left the studio."

According to some reports, the group then fired Murry as their manager. In Gaines' description, Brian had thrown his father against the wall and shouted, "Get out of here! You're fired! Do you understand? You're fired!" However, Love wrote in his 2016 memoir that Murry had already been dismissed as their manager "a couple months" prior to this incident.

Release

"I Get Around", backed with "Don't Worry Baby", was released as a single in the U.S. on May 11, 1964. Cash Box described it as an "exciting, tailored-for-teen- tastes hot rod stomp'er...that should be getting around at a quick clip."

On June 6, "I Get Around" debuted on the Billboard Top 40 chart at number 17. Four weeks later, on July 4, it overtook Peter and Gordon's "A World Without Love" to become the Beach Boys' first chart-topping U.S. hit, as well as America's first number-one hit by a homeland group since November 1963, following the chart dominance of British acts such as the Beatles. Coincidentally, this had occurred on the same day as America's annual Independence Day holiday. The single maintained the number-one position for two weeks.

According to author James Perone, "I Get Around" represented both a successful response by Wilson to the British Invasion, and the beginning of an unofficial rivalry between him and the Beatles, principally Paul McCartney. Lambert concurred, "As 'I Get Around' rose to the top of the charts ... the Beatles surely recognized that they had a formidable rival." In the UK, the single was released in June 1964 and reached number 7 on the Record Retailer chart – the band's first UK hit to breach the top ten. Rolling Stones frontman Mick Jagger gave the song a positive endorsement during an appearance on the British television program Ready Steady Go!.

On July 13, 1964, All Summer Long was released with "I Get Around" as the opening track. A recording of the group's August 1 performance of "I Get Around" at the Civil Memorial Auditorium in Sacramento, California was included on the live album Beach Boys Concert, released in October.

Legacy and recognition
Rolling Stone critic Anthony DeCurtis referenced the song as an example of Wilson's ability to "be very complex and have every single thing you do have an emotional impact, and have the listener not even be aware of it—just hear it the first time and get it. That's hard." Stebbins writes of the song,

In 2017, "I Get Around" was inducted into the Grammy Hall of Fame.

Personnel
Per Craig Slowinski.

The Beach Boys
 Al Jardine – harmony and backing vocals; bass guitar
 Mike Love – lead, harmony and backing vocals
 Brian Wilson – chorus falsetto lead, harmony and backing vocals; piano; harpsichord; Hammond B3 organ
 Carl Wilson – harmony and backing vocals; electric lead and rhythm guitar
 Dennis Wilson – harmony and backing vocals; drums

Session musicians (also known as "the Wrecking Crew")

 Hal Blaine – timbales with brush, rim with thin stick
 Glen Campbell – 6-string electric bass guitar
 Steve Douglas – tenor saxophone (uncertain credit)
 Jay Migliori – baritone saxophone (uncertain credit)
 Ray Pohlman – 6-string electric bass guitar

Charts

Certifications

References

Bibliography

External links
 
 
 

1964 songs
1964 singles
The Beach Boys songs
Billboard Hot 100 number-one singles
Capitol Records singles
Cashbox number-one singles
Doo-wop songs
Jan and Dean songs
RPM Top Singles number-one singles
Songs about transport
Songs written by Brian Wilson
Songs written by Mike Love
Song recordings produced by Brian Wilson
California Sound